Luís André Leite Esteves (born 9 April 1998) is a Portuguese professional footballer who plays as an attacking midfielder for Nacional.

Professional career
Esteves is a youth product of Arada, Sporting CP, Feirense and Braga. He began his career with the semi-pro side Sanjoanense in 2017, before signing with the reserves of Vitória Guimarães. He signed a professional contract with Vitória Guimarães on 23 December 2020. He made his professional debut with Vitória Guimarães in a 3-2 Primeira Liga loss to Gil Vicente on 22 January 2022, coming on as a late sub in the 86th minute.

On 4 July 2022, Esteves signed a three-year contract with Nacional.

References

External links
 
 Desporto profile
 

1998 births
People from Ovar
Sportspeople from Aveiro District
Living people
Portuguese footballers
Association football midfielders
A.D. Sanjoanense players
Vitória S.C. players
Vitória S.C. B players
C.D. Nacional players
Primeira Liga players
Liga Portugal 2 players
Campeonato de Portugal (league) players